Rajkumari or Raj Kumari may refer to:

Title 
 princely title for a daughter of a Raja or equivalent royal princess in Southern Asia

People 
 Rajkumari Singh (disambiguation), people known by the name Rajkumari Singh

 Rajkumari Dubey (1924–2000), Indian playback singer in Hindi cinema of the 1930s and 40s
 Rajkumari Kaul (1928–2014), Indian intellectual
 Rajkumari Amrit Kaur (1887–1964), Indian activist and politician
 Rajkumari Banerji (1847—1876), Indian social worker and Bengali philanthropist
 Rajkumari Devi known also as Kisan Chachi, Indian farmer
 Rajkumari Surajkala, Indian politician from Madhya Pradesh
 Raj Kumari Pandey (born 1969), Nepalese long-distance runner
 Raj Kumari Chauhan, Indian politician from Uttar Pradesh
 Raj Kumari Dhillon, Indian politician from Delhi
 Raj Kumari Thapa, Indian politician from Sikkim

See also
 Raja Kumari, singer